Jaya Indravarman IV was the king of Champa, a former region located within modern-day Vietnam, from 1167–1192. He probably was the same person as Panduranga ruler, Po Klong Garai. A usurper, "he called himself Jaya Indravarman on Vatu and said he came from the 'famous place known by the name Gramapuravijaya."  He was "full of energy, courage and pride...well versed in all the shastra."  He sent tribute to the Court of China and the Dai Viet.  Unsuccessful in purchasing horses from China for an overland invasion, he prepared a squadron of water vessels.

He is noted for leading the Champa invasion of the Khmer Empire in 1177. His naval forces traveled up the Mekong and Tonle Sap rivers to Tonle Sap and sacked Angkor, killing Tribhuvanadityavarman.

In 1190, the Khmer king Jayavarman VII, the son and successor of Dharanindravarman II, sought vengeance against Champa. The capital was taken by Vidyanandana and Jaya was brought back to Cambodia as a prisoner. The King of Cambodia later released him in an attempt to regain is throne in 1191.  However, Vidyanandana defeated him and had Jaya put to death.

He died in 1192. His name translates as Sanskrit Jaya, "victorious"; Indra "possessing drops of rain" from Sanskrit इन्दु (indu) "a drop" and र (ra) "possessing"; and Varman, Sanskrit for an expert in the martial arts. Indra is also the ancient Hindu warrior god of the sky and of rain. He is the chief god in the Hindu text the Rigveda.

References

1192 deaths
Kings of Champa
12th-century Vietnamese monarchs